The Shire of Waroona is a local government area in the Peel region of Western Australia between Mandurah and Harvey and about 110 kilometres (68 mi) south of Perth, the state capital. The Shire covers an area of about 835 km² (322 mi²) and its seat of government is the town of Waroona.

History

The Drakesbrook Road District was established on 29 April 1898, seceding from the larger Murray Road District. The road district maintained the Drakesbrook name for some years after the town itself was renamed, but on 1 July 1961 it was declared a shire as the Shire of Waroona following the passage of the Local Government Act 1960, which reformed all remaining road districts into shires.

Wards

The shire no longer has wards, it is made up of eight councillors who represent the whole of the Shire.

Towns and localities
The towns and localities of the Shire of Waroona with population and size figures based on the most recent Australian census:

Population

Heritage-listed places

As of 2023, 38 places are heritage-listed in the Shire of Waroona, of which four are on the State Register of Heritage Places.

References

External links
 

 
Waroona